Liběna (also Libjena) is a female given name. Derived from the Slavic element l'ub meaning love, bonnie. Related names include Libusha, Ljuba, Lyubov, L'ubica, Ljubina. An old name is Ljubena. Pronounced LIB-yeh-nah.

Name days 
Czech: 6 November
Bulgarian: 17 September

Famous bearers 
Liběna Rochová, Czech fashion designer
Liběna Hlinková, wife of Czech hockey couch Ivan Hlinka
Liběna Sequardtová, Czech oboist
Liběna Skálová, Czech author
Liběna Jarolímková, Czech professor and engineer, expert in tourism industry
Liběna Kantnerová, Czech assistant's professor and engineer
Liběna Kováčová, Czech professor
Liběna Livorová-Hrkalová, Czech actress
Liběna Odstrčilová, Czech stage actress

Connection's article 
Libri.cz (Czech)

External links 
Liběna -> Behind the Name

Czech feminine given names
Slovak feminine given names